Gérald Cottier (22 May 1931 – 20 August 1979) was a Swiss basketball player. He competed in the men's tournament at the 1952 Summer Olympics.

References

1931 births
1979 deaths
Swiss men's basketball players
Olympic basketball players of Switzerland
Basketball players at the 1952 Summer Olympics
Place of birth missing